Elongery, New South Wales  is a bounded rural locality of Wurrumbungle Shire and a civil parish of Baradine County, New South Wales.

The main features of the parish is Warrumbungle National Park and the Anglo-Australian Telescope complex.

References

Localities in New South Wales
Geography of New South Wales
Central West (New South Wales)